Eubranchus tricolor, common name the painted balloon aeolis, is a species of sea slug, an aeolid nudibranch, a marine gastropod mollusc in the family Eubranchidae. It is the type species of the genus Eubranchus.

Taxonomy
According to Pruvot-Fol (1954) the species Amphorina alberti Quatrefages, 1844 is a synonym of Eubranchus tricolor. Opinion 774 of the ICZN decided that Amphorina alberti was a synonym of Eubranchus farrani and suppressed the names Amphorina and A. alberti.

Distribution
This species was first described from the Isle of Man, Irish Sea, United Kingdom. It has subsequently been reported from all around Britain and Ireland, as well as from continental coasts from Norway to Portugal and into the Mediterranean Sea.

Description
This aeolid nudibranch is translucent white with rings of white, yellow and white at the tips of the cerata. The cerata are swollen and translucent with a narrow digestive gland which is usually dull purple in colour. There is a superficial resemblance to Janolus cristatus.

The maximum recorded body length is 10 mm.

Ecology
Minimum recorded depth is 128 m. Maximum recorded depth is 128 m.Eubranchus tricolor feeds on several species of hydroids including Nemertesia antennina and Nemertesia ramosa'', family Plumulariidae.

References

External links
 

Eubranchidae
Gastropods described in 1838